Francia Yakovlevna Mitinen, originally Frances Metianen, and also known, erroneously, as "Francia Yakilnilna Mitynen" (born 31 January 1914) was an Australian-born Soviet "illegal" spy for Soviet military intelligence (GRU) in the United States during the 1940s and 1950s. The main alias used by Mitinen in the US was Edna Margaret Patterson. Her codenames, in Soviet intelligence circles included "Салли" "Sally", and "Австралийка" "Avstraliyka", which (literally translated) is the feminine form of "(The) Australian". US counterintelligence services, however, usually translated the latter name as "The Australian Woman".

Mitinen was born at 85½ Morehead Street, Redfern, an inner suburb of Sydney, on 31 January 1914, according to a 2017 article by Australian historian and journalist Michael Connor. Her full name when her birth was registered was Frances Metianen, and her émigré Russian parents' names also appear in Australian records in the anglicised forms of James and Julie Metianen. Their older children, both of whom had been born before or shortly after the family arrived in Sydney, were known in Australia as Victor and Leonore (or Lena). James Metianen reportedly worked as a fitter at the Eveleigh Railway Workshops.

During the 1920s, the family apparently lived in the Parramatta area, where Frances attended Parramatta High School and the Metianen children took part in local sports teams, including Frances' brother Victor, who was frequently mentioned in newspaper reports regarding amateur cricket matches. James Metianen was involved in pro-Soviet and communist political activities, as were Victor Metianen and his English-born wife Coral (née Sutcliffe).

The entire family apparently moved to the Soviet Union during the 1930s. However, some members of the Mitinen family were imprisoned on political grounds, such as Victor and Coral Mitinen. (According to Connor, Victor Mitinen died in a Gulag during the early 1940s, while Coral Mitinen was released, later visited relatives in England and died at Odessa in 1966.)

Before or during World War II, Francia Mitinen was recruited by the naval branch of the GRU. She entered the United States at San Francisco in August 1943, under the name of Edna Margaret Patterson (and a cover story that included growing up in Seattle). As a result of the Venona signals interception and decryption project, US counterintelligence services became aware of some of the activities of "Sally" or the "Australian Woman", if not her cover name and whereabouts. Mitinen was apparently last mentioned in Venona intercepts during 1956. It is generally believed that she left the US (or disappeared) at around that time. Nothing is known of her subsequent activities.

References 

1914 births
Possibly living people
Soviet spies against the United States
Venona project
GRU officers
Australian emigrants to the Soviet Union
People from Sydney
People educated at Parramatta High School